Panaqolus albivermis is a species of catfish in the family Loricariidae. It is native to South America, where it occurs in the San Alejandro River, which is a tributary of the Ucayali River in Peru. The species reaches 9.6 cm (3.8 inches) SL. 

While not scientifically described until 2013, this species has been known to aquarists since at least 1996. In the aquarium trade, it is typically referred to either as the flash pleco or by its L-number, L-204, which was reportedly designated in 1996. When it was formally described in 2013, the specific epithet that it was given, albivermis, roughly translates to "white worm" in Latin, referring to the distinctive pale-colored worm-like stripes sported by the species.

References 

Ancistrini